Tres Quebradas Airport is an extremely high elevation airport serving mining operations in the Atacama Region of Chile, near the Argentina border.

The runway is in the narrow valley of the Del Tránsito River, an eventual tributary of the Huasco River. The narrowness of the valley leaves little room for course reversal.

See also

Transport in Chile
List of airports in Chile

References

External links
OpenStreetMap - Tres Quebradas
OurAirports - Tres Quebradas
FallingRain - Tres Quebradas Airport

Airports in Chile
Airports in Atacama Region